Hepper is a surname. Notable people with the surname include:

 Brian Hepper (born 1946), Australian rules footballer
 Frank Nigel Hepper (1929–2013), English botanist

See also
 Hopper (surname)
 Kepper